Sandilands tram stop is a light rail stop in the London Borough of Croydon in the southern suburbs of London. It serves the residential area along Addiscombe Road to the east of the centre of the town of Croydon.

Services
Sandilands is served by tram services operated by Tramlink. 

It is served by the following tram services:
 A tram every 7-8 minutes (reducing to every 15 mins on weekend evenings) between New Addington and 

Services are operated using Bombardier CR4000 and Stadler Variobahn Trams.

Connections
The stop is served by London Buses routes 119, 194, 198 and 466 which provide connections to Bromley, Beckenham, Hayes, Croydon Town Centre, Thornton Heath, Purley and Caterham.

Free interchange for journeys made within an hour is available between bus services and between buses and trams is available at Sandilands as part of Transport for London's Hopper Fare.

Layout
Immediately to the east of the tram stop, the line descends in cutting to a junction with the trackbed of the former Woodside and South Croydon Railway. To the west of the stop, the line runs alongside Addiscombe Road on a reserved track as far as the junction with Chepstow Road. From Chepstow Road the line runs within Addiscombe Road, sharing road space with buses and local traffic.

The area of Sandilands tram stop was one of the few places where property demolition was needed during the construction of Tramlink, in order to make way for both the stop and the cutting link to the former railway line.

2016 derailment

References

External links

Sandilands Tram Stop – Timetables and live departures at Transport for London

Tramlink stops in the London Borough of Croydon